Michael David O'Brien (born August 23, 1964) is an American Christian musician and worship leader, who primarily plays Christian pop and contemporary worship music. He released eight solo albums since 1990. He was a touring member of the Heritage Singers, before becoming a full-fledged member of NewSong, in 1999.

Early and personal life
Michael David O'Brien was born on August 23, 1964, in Miami, Florida, where he resided until he was 11 years old. Then he moved to Lafayette, Louisiana where he got involved in music at Comeaux High School. He graduated there and attended USL studying vocal performance. He worked as a bartender in several restaurants and then in his early-twenties, moved back to Miami to live with his sister Dana for a couple of years. He met his wife, Heidi, in the singing group the Heritage Singers. They were married on March 3, 1989, and then in August they moved to Encinitas, California where Michael took a job as a Young Adult Pastor at North Coast Christian Fellowship. His wife Heidi worked there as well. The couple would move to Nashville, Tennessee in April 1991. Working at the Cooker as a waiter until in 1993 he would sign a songwriting deal with Meadowgreen Music. During that time, he sang with a group called Bash and played keyboards for the Allies, Allison Durham and Twila Paris. Michael then signed a record deal with Benson Records in 1994. He recorded 3 CDs with them. He would then join the group Newsong as their lead singer in 1999 until 2006. He has been solo ever since. He and his wife had four children: Meghan, Michael, Joseph, and Timmy. They currently live in Columbia, Tennessee.

Music career
He started his music recording career in 1990, with the album, Someone Needs to Tell Them, which was an Indie project. His subsequent album, Michael O'Brien, was released in 1995, with Benson Records. The third album, Conviction, was released in 1996, again by Benson Records. He released, Godspeed, in 1998, also with Benson Records. His fifth studio album, Something About Us, was released in 2007, with Miracle Productions. He released his 6th album "Be Still My Soul" in 2010. And then his first holiday album, Christ'mas, in 2013, by Miracle Productions. His eighth album, Psalms, Hymns and Spiritual Songs, was released in 2015, with Miracle productions. And he just released his latest project "Crown Him" in 2020.

Personal life
His son Joseph O'Brien is a singer songwriter who took part in 2018 in season 13 of America's Got Talent with his own song "We Could Build A House".

Discography

Studio albums
 Someone Needs to Tell Them (1990)
 Michael O'Brien (1995)
 Conviction (1996)
 Godspeed (1998)
 Signature Songs (2000)
 Something About Us (2007)
 Be Still My Soul (2010)
 Christ'mas (2013)
 Psalms, Hymns and Spiritual Songs (2015)
 Crown Him (2020)

with NewSong
 Sheltering Tree (2000)
 The Christmas Shoes (2001)
 More Life (2003)
 Live Worship Rescue (2005)

Duets
 ‘’ Nicole Mullen ‘’
 ‘’ Larnelle Harris ‘’
 ‘’ Lenny Leblanc’’
 ‘’ Steve Green ‘’
 ‘’ Dallas Holm ‘’
 ‘’ David Meece ‘’ 
 ‘’ Natalie Grant ‘’
 ‘’ Russ Lee ‘’

References

External links
 Official website

1964 births
Living people
American performers of Christian music
Musicians from Miami
Musicians from San Diego
Musicians from Nashville, Tennessee
Songwriters from Florida
Songwriters from California
Songwriters from Tennessee